Los Angeles Valley College (LAVC) is a public community college in Los Angeles, California. It is part of the Los Angeles Community College District.

The college is adjacent to Grant High School in the neighborhood of Valley Glen. Often called "Valley College" or simply "Valley" by those who frequent the campus, it opened its doors to the public on September 12, 1949, at which time the campus was located on the site of Van Nuys High School. The college moved to its current location in 1951, a  site bounded by Fulton Avenue on the west, Ethel Avenue/Coldwater Canyon Boulevard on the east, Burbank Boulevard on the south, and Oxnard Street on the north.

Los Angeles Valley College is one of nine colleges in the Los Angeles Community College District (LACCD) and is accredited by the Accrediting Commission for Community and Junior Colleges.

The sports teams are the Monarchs and the school colors are green and yellow.

History

Los Angeles Valley College was founded on September 12, 1949, to meet the tremendous growth of the San Fernando Valley during the 1940s and early 1950s. The college was officially chartered by the Los Angeles Board of Education in June 1949, and was located on the campus of Van Nuys High School. In 1951 Valley College moved to its permanent  site on Fulton Avenue in Valley Glen.

In 1954, members of the faculty founded the Athenaeum which began to offer community programs that brought the Los Angeles Philharmonic to the campus. The campus also had internationally known speakers including Eustace St. James, Eleanor Roosevelt, Clement Attlee, Margaret Mead, and Louis Leakey.

In 1969, the Los Angeles Community College District was formed and its nine colleges were separated from the Los Angeles Unified School District.

In December 2016, many of the college's electronic files were maliciously encrypted, disrupting voicemail, email, and computer files. A ransom note demanded $28,000 in Bitcoin in exchange for a decryption key. The Los Angeles Community College District paid the amount.

In 2016, Los Angeles Community College District approved the construction of the Valley Academic and Cultural Center building to meet campus needs.  The project was originally scheduled to be completed and opened in 2018 but the completion date has been pushed back twice, first to 2020 and then to 2022. Although the project was originally approved with at $78.5 million budget, the cost has increased to over $100 million.

Campus security incidents 
In January 2014, a man was fatally shot in the parking lot of Los Angeles Valley College due to a drug-deal gone bad.  Two men were later arrested in connection.

In 2014 and 2016, Los Angeles Valley College was locked down and evacuated several times due to reports of active shooters. In February 2014, a former student was detained in a "swatting" incident where another person called in a fake threat that the student was planning to shoot the school. She was released after several hours when it was determined to be a hoax. In June 2014, Los Angeles Valley College received a threatening phone-call from a man claiming he was coming to the school with guns.  The campus was lockdown however the threat failed to materialize and Sheriff's opened an investigation. On March 30, 2016, Los Angeles Valley College was evacuated due to a suspicious package on campus and a bomb threat. On November 10, 2016, the campus was again locked down due to shots being reported on campus.  It was later claimed that the reports were an old car backfiring.

Academics
More than 140 associate degree programs and certificate programs are offered at Valley College.

Tau Alpha Epsilon Honors society

Los Angeles Valley College has its own honors society called Tau Alpha Epsilon (TAE). TAE was founded in 1949, the same year that Los Angeles Valley College was established. In 1960, due to the popularity of junior colleges, a two-year version of the  four year honors society Phi Beta Kappa was created called Phi Theta Kappa (PTK). Because of this, PTK merged with TAE at Los Angeles Valley College. The purpose of TAE is to act as the honors society for Los Angeles Valley College, encourage academic excellence, and work with fellow clubs and organizations to better the campus and community.

Transport
Los Angeles Valley College has its own stop on the Metro Orange Line, the Valley College Metro station. It is located at the intersection of Burbank Boulevard and Fulton Avenue. The nearest campus buildings are less than a 5-minute walk from the station.

Notable alumni
 Sean Astin - actor, best known for playing Sam in The Lord of the Rings films.
 Gene Baur - president and cofounder of Farm Sanctuary
 Ed Begley, Jr. - actor and environmentalist.
 Stefano Bloch - author and academic.
 Adam Carolla - comedian, podcaster and author.
 Bobby Castillo - former Major League Baseball pitcher and 1981 World Series Champion with the Los Angeles Dodgers.
 José Cortéz - former American football placekicker.
 Bryan Cranston - actor (Hal on Malcolm in the Middle; Walter White on Breaking Bad.
 Mark Dacascos - martial artist, actor (Toby Wong in Drive, Ling in Cradle 2 the Grave, the chairman in Iron Chef America)
 Micky Dolenz - lead singer of The Monkees.
 Pat Doyle - baseball coach
 Briana Evigan - actress, best known for playing Andie West in Step Up 2: The Streets and Step Up All In.
 David Gerrold, writer
 Bryan Henderson - American football player
 Francisco Herrera - Los Angeles Dodgers ball boy
 Jack Hirsch, college basketball player and coach 
 Huston Huddleston - Writer, director, and museum founder
 Charlie Kendall - American football player
 Jerry Mathers, actor, best known for playing Beaver Cleaver in Leave It to Beaver.
 Troy Miller - American film producer, director and screenwriter.
 Dennis Moeller, professional baseball player
 Christopher Norris - movie and television actress
 Kimberly Paige - actress, graduated summa cum laude ('98), youngest student to enroll (age 12) and to graduate (age 15).
 Michael Richards - actor ("Kramer" on Seinfeld); took theatre classes at LAVC and was in many of Valley's theatre productions.
 Richard Rossi - musician, filmmaker: biopics on lives of Aimee Semple McPherson and Roberto Clemente; earned Cinema Arts and Theater Arts degrees, and now teaches a guitar class at LAVC.
 Tom Selleck - actor (Thomas Magnum on Magnum, P.I.. Selleck played on the basketball team while at Valley.
 Phil Snyder - voice actor, best known as the voice of Jiminy Cricket. Professor of Digital Media at University of Houston.
 Kevin Spacey - actor (Best Supporting Actor The Usual Suspects, Best Actor for Lester Burnham in American Beauty).
 Jeff Wayne - musician, best known as composer of The War of the Worlds (double album)
Bill Wold - basketball player

See also

 Great Wall of Los Angeles
Monarch Stadium

References

External links 
 

 
Universities and colleges in the San Fernando Valley
Universities and colleges in Los Angeles
Van Nuys, Los Angeles
Schools accredited by the Western Association of Schools and Colleges
Educational institutions established in 1949
1949 establishments in California
Two-year colleges in the United States
Valley Glen, Los Angeles
California Community Colleges